Three cities submitted bids to host the 1999 Pan American Games that were recognized by the Pan American Sports Organization. The voting took place on July 31, 1994, in Guayaquil, Ecuador.

Host city selection 
Any country that had previously held the games were allotted two votes; those countries were Argentina, Brazil, Canada, Colombia, Mexico, the United States, and Venezuela, making 50 votes in total, and a city needed majority vote (26) to win.

After the first round of voting, Bogotá was forced to drop out having the fewest votes with 10. In the second round, Winnipeg and Santo Domingo reached a 25-to-25 tie. Canadian Committee Co-Chairman Don Mackenzie convinced the Olympic Committees in the third round, focusing on the fact that "Santo Domingo had no place for water-skiing, but Portage la Prairie has one of the best water-skiing facilities in Canada." Winnipeg went on to defeat Santo Domingo by a vote of 28 to 22.

Candidate cities

Winnipeg, Canada 
In 1988, a delegation from Winnipeg announced that once it got approval from the Canadian Olympic Association, the city would submit a bid to host the 1999 Pan American Games. On December 5, 1992, Winnipeg secured the Canadian bidding rights, defeating Toronto by one vote. Other Canadian cities in the running were Halifax, Edmonton, and Sherbrooke.

In an attempt to secure the Latin American vote, the bid committee hired a Uruguayan presenter named Carlos Garcia. Garcia, who lived in Toronto, was a very effective presenter and had strong relationships with many of the National Olympic Committee members in the Americas. Additionally, the city presented an original song, written and performed by Burton Cummings, during its presentation. Winnipeg went on to defeat Santo Domingo in the third round.

Santo Domingo, Dominican Republic 
Following the 1986 Central American and Caribbean Games held in Santiago de los Caballeros, President of the Dominican Republic Olympic Committee Dr. José Joaquín Puello announced a 13-point "ten-year plan," from 1989 to 1999, in which the last point was to hold the Pan American Games. The country gained support of President of the Pan American Sports Organization Mario Vázquez Raña following thereafter; on June 24, 1986, Raña urged Puello to bid for Pan American Games.

On June 21, 1994,  President of the Dominican Republic Joaquín Balaguer issued Decree 181–94, declaring that it was "of national interest to obtain the venue for the celebration in the city of Santo Domingo of the 1999 Pan American Games, and therefore, all the official authorities of the country are asked to give their collaboration to the Dominican Olympic Committee (COD) to achieve this objective." President Balaguer also issued an emotional letter assembly that would meet in Guayaquil, Ecuador, in which a portion of it read, "We want, again, to be protagonists of history. Just as we were the land that opened the doors to American civilization, to conclude the century with the sports festival of the Continent." The city ultimately fell short, losing to Winnipeg in the third round of voting.

Bogotá, Colombia 
Bogotá officially presented its proposal to the Pan American Sports Organization on March 9, 1993. Bogotá had never held the Pan American Games; however, Cali held the 1971 Pan American Games. On November 16, 1993, Mayor Jaime Castro Castro was announced as the leader of Bogotá's hosting campaign for the 1999 Pan American Games during the 1993 Central American and Caribbean Games. Castro, under the slogan En Colombia todo está dispuesto (English: In Colombia, everything is ready), pitched to PASO that the city has fulfilled the commitments made to the international community, particularly in the sports field. The city fell short, however, as it was knocked out in the first round of voting.

Showed preliminary interest 
 Brasilia, Brazil 
 San Juan, Puerto Rico
 Denver, United States

References

1999 Pan American Games
Bids for the Pan American Games